Severino Santiapichi (26 May 1926 – 16 September 2016) was an Italian magistrate and writer.

Born in Scicli, Ragusa, he was the president of the Courts of Assize in Rome for about 20 years, notably presiding over the Aldo Moro trial in 1978 and the Pope John Paul II assassination attempt trial in 1981. He was also, for several years, vice president of the Supreme Court in Somalia. After the retirement, he wrote several non-fiction novels and was professor at the Kore University of Enna.

References 

1926 births
2016 deaths
People from Scicli
20th-century Italian judges
Italian non-fiction writers
Italian male non-fiction writers
Writers from the Province of Ragusa
Jurists from Sicily